Aliénor Rougeot (born January 1999) is a Canadian-French climate justice activist.

Rougeot came to national prominence in Canada as a Climate Strike organizer. She is a leader for Toronto's Fridays for Future Strikes, a movement calling on students to miss school on Fridays to raise awareness for climate change. In 2019 she led the Fridays for Future school strike for climate in Toronto which brought out over 50 000 people.

Activism 
Rougeot started as a local activist at a very young age, raising awareness of biodiversity loss within her community. She was also involved with her local Amnesty International chapter where she led campaigns to raise awareness for the refugee crisis and demand justice for migrants and refugees in Europe.

Climate Justice Activism 
Aliénor Rougeot co-organized the youth climate strike and led Canada's mass “teach-in” at Toronto's mass climate strike as part of the Global Week for Future in September 2019, an event that drew thousands of people to the grounds of Queen's Park.

Education 
Alienor graduated with an Honours BA from the University of Toronto, in Canada, where she studied Economics and Public Policy. She was recognized as a UTAA Scholar for her academic excellence and community involvement.

Awards and recognition 
For her climate justice advocacy, Rougeot has been recognized as one of the:

 30 Under 30 Sustainability Leaders in 2019 by Corporate Knights 
 Top 25 Under 25 Environmentalists in 2020 by The Starfish 
 50 most influential Torontonians by Toronto Life magazine in 2019 
 Emerging Leaders, Clean 50 by Clean 50

References 

Youth activists
Activists from Toronto
University of Toronto people
Living people
Climate activists
Canadian activists
1999 births
Youth climate activists